Qir (also Romanized as Qīr) is a city and capital of Qir and Karzin County, Fars Province, Iran. At the 2006 census, its population was 16,839, in 3,722 families.

On 10 April 1972, Qir was destroyed by a large earthquake, killing 3,399 people, two-thirds of the population at that time.

References

Populated places in Qir and Karzin County

Cities in Fars Province